The Purangi River is a river of the Coromandel Peninsula in New Zealand's North Island. It flows north to reach Mercury Bay to the east of Whitianga.

See also
List of rivers of New Zealand

References

Thames-Coromandel District
Rivers of Waikato
Rivers of New Zealand